General elections were held in the Cayman Islands on 24 May 2017. They were the first elections held after electoral reforms approved in a 2012 referendum, which introduced single member constituencies.

The People's Progressive Movement remained the largest party, winning seven of the 19 seats. However, independents emerged as the largest group in the Legislative Assembly with nine seats.

Results

By constituency

Government formation
Initially, a coalition government between the Progressives, Cayman Democratic Party members and independents was announced.  Under the arrangement, Alden McLaughlin would have remained as premier and McKeeva Bush would have become speaker. However, an agreement was later reached between the Cayman Democratic Party and all independent members apart from one to form a “government of national unity” in which McKeeva Bush will take office as Premier.  In response, Alden McLaughlin suggested the incoming government would be a "train wreck" and that he did not "expect this government to last very long".

It was then revealed that the deal between the CDP and independent members had failed, and that discussions on government formation were ongoing by all parties.

Eventually, the coalition government originally proposed between the Progressives, Cayman Democratic Party members and independent members was agreed upon, and took office with Alden McLaughlin as Premier on 31 May.

References

External links
Electoral district map Cayman 27
Cayman Islands Elections 2017  | Cayman Legislative Assembly Full Results

2017 elections in British Overseas Territories
2017 elections in the Caribbean
2017
2017 in the Cayman Islands
May 2017 events in North America
Election and referendum articles with incomplete results